Bonanza is a census-designated place (CDP) in Clayton County, Georgia, United States. The population was 3,135 at the 2010 census.

Geography
Bonanza is located in southern Clayton County at  (33.464663, -84.337589). It is bordered by Irondale to the north and Lovejoy to the south.

Demographics

2020 census

As of the 2020 United States census, there were 4,406 people, 1,220 households, and 885 families residing in the CDP.

2000 census
As of the census of 2000, there were 2,904 people, 934 households, and 765 families residing in the CDP. The racial makeup of the CDP was 62.74% White, 30.61% African American, 0.24% Native American, 1.58% Asian, 0.03% Pacific Islander, 3.62% from other races, and 1.17% from two or more races. Hispanic or Latino of any race were 5.44% of the population.

There were 934 households, out of which 48.0% had children under the age of 18 living with them, 61.3% were married couples living together, 15.3% had a female householder with no husband present, and 18.0% were non-families. 13.4% of all households were made up of individuals, and 3.2% had someone living alone who was 65 years of age or older.  The average household size was 3.11 and the average family size was 3.40.

In the CDP, the population was spread out, with 32.6% under the age of 18, 8.0% from 18 to 24, 35.7% from 25 to 44, 17.9% from 45 to 64, and 5.9% who were 65 years of age or older.  The median age was 30 years. For every 100 females, there were 93.7 males.  For every 100 females age 18 and over, there were 87.7 males.

The median income for a household in the CDP was $44,609, and the median income for a family was $49,667. Males had a median income of $35,755 versus $25,024 for females. The per capita income for the CDP was $15,575.  About 6.8% of families and 12.2% of the population were below the poverty line, including 11.7% of those under age 18 and 12.1% of those age 65 or over.

References

Census-designated places in Clayton County, Georgia
Census-designated places in Georgia (U.S. state)